is a role-playing video game for SNK's Neo Geo CD system, which retells the events of Samurai Shodown and Samurai Shodown II in greater detail. It was ported to the Sega Saturn and PlayStation,

Gameplay 

The basic setup of the game is very similar to most console RPGs, such as Final Fantasy. The characters roam an overworld, enter towns and dungeons, and get into battles, which occur on a separate screen. The menu options enable equipping of armor and accessories, as well as use of items.

At the outset, the player is given the option to choose from six characters to be the "main" character of the story. The basic outline of the plot does not diverge greatly for any of them, but each had different dialogue ingame, and each also had unique special scenes which would go into greater detail of the character. In addition, to better adjust to character continuity, certain stories were modified slightly based on the selected chapter. Over the course of the game, two other characters can also join the party (unless the hero is Genjuro, who only gains a partner in his second story). In addition, the second chapter also introduces a new character, Shippuu no Reon (疾風の鈴音), whose name translates roughly to "The Ringing of the Gale Winds." All characters from the first two Samurai Shodown games make an appearance, either as a temporary helper, plot device, or enemy.

Combat includes an option to input the joystick motions for the various special moves manually, as in the arcade games, rather than simply selecting the moves from a list.

While armor and accessories can be bought and equipped, each character has the same weapon throughout the game. Characters can visit blacksmiths to temper and strengthen their weapons. These smiths can also infuse the weapons with one of the game's various elements, which make the weapon's normal strikes and select special moves more effective against certain enemies.

Plot

Development
The development history of the game is fairly storied. It was announced for development in 1995, and underwent many delays in the process, finally being released a few years later. For some time, rumors abounded that it was never going to come out. A U.S. release was planned for the third quarter of 1997 (just a few months after the Japanese release), but it never materialized.

As originally envisioned, the game was to be split into three episodes: one for each of the three games in the series. For a while, it was to be a Neo Geo CD exclusive, but developmental and financial pressures caused SNK to also release it for two other current systems. SNK decided that each version was to contain only two of the three episodes, thereby necessitating a player to buy two copies of the game in order to get the whole story. This plan resulted in a significant backlash from fans, and was discarded.

Eventually, as development ground on, the executive decision was made to scrap the third chapter entirely, and focus solely on the first two, so as to allow the game to be released sooner.

Release
While the core gameplay is largely similar between the versions, there are aesthetic and gameplay differences between the Neo Geo CD and PlayStation/Saturn versions.
The Neo Geo CD version has considerably more animation in the combat sprites than the PS and Saturn, including unique idle stances for each character and specialized death animations for monsters.
The Neo Geo CD version has more ornate and colorful menus, whereas the PS and Saturn versions have fairly blank, purple-and-green menus instead.
Motions in the Neo Geo CD version have a smoother look and feel than the others.
In the overworld map, the NeoCD version uses a scaled-down version of the dungeon/down character sprite. The PS version uses a new sprite entirely.
The Neo Geo CD runs in its native resolution of 304x224, whereas the PS and Saturn run in 320x240.
The Neo Geo CD version has less pauses between audio clips than the others.
The PS and Saturn version have significant animation cuts in the characters' walk/run animations.
The PS version enables the player to select the strength of a normal attack after choosing a target, whereas the Neo Geo CD does not.
The PS version shows an Active Time Battle bar, which the NeoCD lacks.
The PS version has higher-quality music than either of the other two versions, owing to higher-quality PCM samples.

The most obvious differences between the three versions are the bonus modes which are unlocked after beating the game.
Neo Geo CD: A third "mini-chapter" is enabled, wherein the player controls Hisame Shizumaru as he wanders around, running into cameo appearances of various SNK characters from other games.
PlayStation: A "side story" mode is enabled, which enables the player to view non-interactive sequences about many of the series' other characters.
Saturn: An interview mode is enabled, which enables the player to view a lengthy, non-interactive sequence about the various characters, frequently breaking the fourth wall. This bonus content is also available in the PlayStation version, by way of a hacked save file.

Reception

According to Famitsu, Shinsetsu Samurai Spirits Bushidō Retsuden on Neo Geo CD sold over 20,256 copies in its first week on the market. Famitsu also reported that both the PlayStation and Sega Saturn versions sold over 37,353 and 28,122 copies respectively in their first week on the market as well.

In 2014, HobbyConsolas identified Shinsetsu Samurai Spirits Bushidō Retsuden as one of the twenty best games for the Neo Geo CD.

Notes

References

External links 
 Shinsetsu Samurai Spirits Bushidō Retsuden at MobyGames

1997 video games
Japan-exclusive video games
Neo Geo CD games
PlayStation (console) games
Role-playing video games
Samurai Shodown video games
Sega Saturn games
Single-player video games
SNK games
Video games about samurai
Video games developed in Japan